Saint-Jean  is a quartier of Saint Barthélemy in the Caribbean. It is located in the northern part of the island. It contains one of the best known beaches on the island and is the centre of water sport activity on the island.

Populated places in Saint Barthélemy
Quartiers of Saint Barthélemy